The 2012 Pan American Trampoline and Tumbling Championships were held in Santiago de Querétaro, Mexico, November 28–December 3, 2012. The competition was organized by the Mexican Gymnastics Federation, and approved by the International Gymnastics Federation.

Medalists

References 

Pan American Trampoline and Tumbling Championships
Pan American Gymnastics Championships
International gymnastics competitions hosted by Mexico
Pan American Trampoline and Tumbling Championships
Pan American Trampoline and Tumbling Championships
Pan American Trampoline and Tumbling Championships